In mathematics,  Borel summation is a summation method for divergent series, introduced by . It is particularly useful for summing divergent asymptotic series, and in some sense gives the best possible sum for such series. There are several variations of this method that are also called Borel summation, and a generalization of it called Mittag-Leffler summation.

Definition

There are (at least) three slightly different methods called Borel summation. They differ in which series they can sum, but are consistent, meaning that if two of the methods sum the same series they give the same answer.

Throughout let  denote a formal power series

Borel's exponential summation method

Let  denote the partial sum

Borel's integral summation method

Borel's integral summation method with analytic continuation

This is similar to Borel's integral summation method, except that the Borel transform need not converge for all , but converges to an analytic function of  near 0 that can be analytically continued along the positive real axis.

Basic properties

Regularity

Nonequivalence of Borel and weak Borel summation
However, one can construct examples of series which are divergent under weak Borel summation, but which are Borel summable. The following theorem characterises the equivalence of the two methods.

Theorem.
Let  be a formal power series, and fix , then:
 If , then .
 If , and  then .

Relationship to other summation methods

Uniqueness theorems

There are always many different functions with any given asymptotic expansion. However, there is sometimes a best possible function, in the sense that the errors in the finite-dimensional approximations are as small as possible in some region. Watson's theorem and Carleman's theorem show that Borel summation produces such a best possible sum of the series.

Watson's theorem

Watson's theorem gives conditions for a function to be the Borel sum of its asymptotic series. Suppose that  is a function satisfying the following conditions:
 is holomorphic in some region ,  for some positive  and .
In this region  has an asymptotic series  with the property that the error
 
is bounded by

for all  in the region (for some positive constant ).

Then Watson's theorem says that in this region  is given by the Borel sum of its asymptotic series.

Carleman's theorem

Carleman's theorem shows that a function is uniquely determined by an asymptotic series in a sector provided the errors in the finite order approximations do not grow too fast.

Carleman's theorem gives a summation method for any asymptotic series whose terms do not grow too fast, as the sum can be defined to be the unique function with this asymptotic series in a suitable sector if it exists. Borel summation is slightly weaker than special case of this when  for some constant . In practice this generalization is of little use, as there are almost no natural examples of series summable by this method that cannot also be summed by Borel's method.

Example

The function  has the asymptotic series  with an error bound of the form above in the region  for any , but is not given by the Borel sum of its asymptotic series. This shows that the number  in Watson's theorem cannot be replaced by any smaller number (unless the bound on the error is made smaller).

Examples

The geometric series
Consider the geometric series

The Borel transform is

from which we obtain the Borel sum

which converges in the larger region , giving an analytic continuation of the original series.

An alternating factorial series
Consider the series

then  does not converge for any nonzero . The Borel transform is

So the Borel sum is

(where  is the incomplete gamma function).

This integral converges for all , so the original divergent series is Borel summable for all such. This function  has an asymptotic expansion as  tends to 0 that is given by the original divergent series. This is a typical example of the fact that Borel summation will sometimes "correctly" sum divergent asymptotic expansions.

Again, since 
 

for all , the equivalence theorem ensures that weak Borel summation has the same domain of convergence, .

An example in which equivalence fails

Consider

After changing the order of summation, the Borel transform is given by

At  the Borel sum is given by

where  is the Fresnel integral. Via the convergence theorem along chords, the Borel integral converges for all  (the integral diverges for ).

For the weak Borel sum we note that

Existence results and the domain of convergence

Summability on chords
Moreover, there exists a function  analytic throughout the disk with radius  such that

 

for all .

More can be said about the domain of convergence of the Borel sum, than that it is a star domain, which is referred to as the Borel polygon, and is determined by the singularities of the series .

The Borel polygon
For , let  denote the line passing through  which is perpendicular to the chord . Define the sets

An alternative definition was used by Borel and Phragmén . Referring to the set  as a polygon is somewhat of a misnomer, since the set need not be polygonal at all; if, however,  has only finitely many singularities then  will in fact be a polygon.

The following theorem, due to Borel and Phragmén provides convergence criteria for Borel summation.

Theorem .
The series  is  summable at all , and is  divergent at all .

Note that  summability for  depends on the nature of the point.

Example 1
Let  denote the -th roots of unity, and consider

 

Example 2
The formal series

converges for all  (for instance, by the comparison test with the geometric series). In particular one sees that the Borel polygon is not polygonal.

A Tauberian theorem
A Tauberian theorem provides conditions under which convergence of one summation method implies convergence under another method. The principal Tauberian theorem for Borel summation provides conditions under which the weak Borel method implies convergence of the series.

Theorem .

 

then , and the series converges for all .

Applications
Borel summation finds application in perturbation expansions in quantum field theory. In particular in 2-dimensional Euclidean field theory the Schwinger functions can often be recovered from their perturbation series using Borel summation . Some of the singularities of the Borel transform are related to instantons and renormalons in quantum field theory .

Generalizations

This generalization is given by Mittag-Leffler summation.

In the most general case, Borel summation is generalized by Nachbin resummation, which can be used when the bounding function is of some general type (psi-type), instead of being exponential type.

See also
 Abel summation
 Abel's theorem
 Abel–Plana formula
 Euler summation
 Cesàro summation
 Lambert summation
 Nachbin resummation
 Abelian and tauberian theorems
 Van Wijngaarden transformation

Notes

References

Mathematical series
Summability methods
Quantum chromodynamics